Cardy (also La Crosse, LaCrosse) is an unincorporated community in Macon County, Missouri, United States.

An early variant name was "La Crosse". A post office called La Crosse was established in 1888, and remained in operation until 1957. La Crosse is a name derived from the French language, meaning "the cross".

Notes

Unincorporated communities in Macon County, Missouri
Unincorporated communities in Missouri